Roxalana "Roxana" Druse (née Teftt; born  – hanged February 28, 1887), was the last woman hanged in the state of New York. The first woman to be hanged in four decades in Central New York, her botched execution resulted in the decision to replace the gallows with the electric chair in 1890.

Mrs. Druse murdered her husband, William Druse, in their home in Warren, New York. The murder unfolded with the help of her son and daughter, George and Mary Druse, and nephew Frank Gates. The family members were threatened with death if they refused and all had an involvement with the murder case. Druse claimed that her motive was that her husband was abusive to her and was not supporting the family because he had left for a number of days after an argument. Frank Gates and George Druse were later released due to their lack of involvement in the murder. During the trial, Mary Druse admitted to assisting in the murder, and was sentenced to life at the Onondaga Country penitentiary. On October 6, 1885 Roxalana was sentenced to be hanged.

Events of the murder
On December 18, 1884, on the morning before the murder, the Druses had a fight. Fights were common between them, and many residents reported signs of foul play. The couple were known in the community for their arguments and disagreements (which the defense later presented to the jury to convince them that Mr. Druse was in fact abusive to his wife). During this dispute, Roxalana concealed a revolver under her apron, which she placed in another room. Upon instruction from his mother, 10-year-old George Druse left the house while his 19-year-old sister Mary remained in the house. 

Mary then tied a rope around her father's neck while Mrs. Druse fired the revolver, wounding Mr. Druse. She then forced her 14-year-old nephew Frank Gates to further fire at her husband. Pleading for help and unable to move, Mr. Druse was decapitated by his wife with an axe. The body parts were taken into the parlor, where they remained all day until Mrs. Druse cut up the body and burnt it to ash on the stove. She also burned William's clothes to further destroy evidence and erase evidence of his presence from the house. The conspirators produced false documents which read that Mr. Druse had left the house after an argument and his whereabouts were unknown. In order to further the idea that William disappeared, Roxalana threatened that she would kill her daughter and the boys (who were playing checkers) if they admitted to the crime. The ashes were dumped in a nearby swamp, while the axe and the revolver were wrapped up and dumped in a pond.

William Druse was later reported missing by the police on the same day. Investigation led to the murder weapon, an axe sold previously to William Druse, wrapped in paper in a pond, along with the revolver. Multiple allegations were reported against wife Roxalana, yet due to lack of evidence, nothing was officially reported. On January 16, 1885, Frank Gates admitted to the crime after consistent harassment by neighbors. Gates and Mrs. Druse were arrested and brought to trial on September 21, 1885; the trial lasted nearly two weeks.

Execution
When Druse was sentenced to death in Herkimer County, New York, suspension hanging was the method of execution. The process jerked the prisoner upwards by a weighted rope instead of the dropping the body through a trap door. But Druse was a small woman, and the suspension force failed to break her neck, leaving her to die agonizingly by strangulation. The scene was so upsetting, officials decided to switch the primary method of execution in New York to the electric chair.

See also
 Capital punishment in New York (state)
 Capital punishment in the United States
 List of people executed in New York

References

External links
Two Famous Murder Trials

1840s births
1887 deaths
1884 murders in the United States
19th-century executions by New York (state)
19th-century American criminals
19th-century American women
American people executed for murder
Executed people from New York (state)
People from Herkimer County, New York
19th-century executions by the United States
American female murderers
People executed by New York (state) by hanging
Executed American women
People convicted of murder by New York (state)
19th-century executions of American people
Date of birth unknown
Place of birth unknown
Mariticides